First United Methodist Church is a Methodist church in Dallas, Texas.

References

External links
 

United Methodist churches in Texas
20th-century Methodist church buildings in the United States
Buildings and structures in Dallas
Methodist churches in Texas